Eopleurotoma is an extinct genus of sea snails, marine gastropod mollusks in the family Turridae, the turrids.

Species
Species within the genus Eopleurotoma include:
 † Eopleurotoma bella Tracey & Craig, 2019 
 † Eopleurotoma bicincta Tracey & Craig, 2019 
 † Eopleurotoma boxleyi Tracey & Craig, 2019 
 † Eopleurotoma christinae Tracey & Craig, 2019 
 † Eopleurotoma distanticosta (Cossmann & Pissarro, 1900) 
 † Eopleurotoma fluctuosa (Deshayes, 1865) 
 † Eopleurotoma fresvillensis (Cossmann & Pissarro, 1900) 
 † Eopleurotoma hastula Tracey & Craig, 2019 
 † Eopleurotoma longicauda Brébion, 1992 
 † Eopleurotoma morelleti J. K. Tucker & Le Renard, 1993†
 † Eopleurotoma multinoda (Lamarck, 1804)
 † Eopleurotoma palmeri Le Renard, 1994
 † Eopleurotoma procera (Cossmann & Pissarro, 1900) 
 † Eopleurotoma scitula Tracey & Craig, 2019 
 † Eopleurotoma spreta (Deshayes, 1865) 
 † Eopleurotoma undata (Lamarck, 1804)
 † Eopleurotoma vauvillensis Tracey & Craig, 2019

References

 Tracey S., Craig B. & Gain O. (2019). Turridae (Gastropoda, Conoidea) from the late Lutetian Eocene of the Cotentin, NW France: endemism through loss of planktotrophy?. Carnets de Voyages Paléontologiques dans le Bassin Anglo-Parisien. 5: 101-140.

External links
 Cossmann M. (1889). Catalogue illustré des coquilles fossiles de l'Éocène des environs de Paris. Annales de la Société Royale Malacologique de Belgique. 24: 3-381, 12 pls.
 MNHN, Paris: holotype of Eopleurotoma palmeri de Boury, 1899

Turridae
Gastropod genera